Sincock may refer to:

Andrew Sincock OAM (born 1951), former first-class cricketer
Bert Sincock (1887–1946), left-handed pitcher in Major League Baseball
David Sincock (born 1942), former Australian cricketer
Harrold Sincock (1907–1982), Australian cricketer
Peter Sincock (born 1948), Australian cricketer
Russell Sincock (born 1947), Australian former cricketer